Calcium iodide (chemical formula CaI2) is the ionic compound of calcium and iodine. This colourless deliquescent solid is a salt that is highly soluble in water. Its properties are similar to those for related salts, such as calcium chloride. It is used in photography. It is also used in cat food as a source of iodine.

Reactions
Henri Moissan first isolated pure calcium in 1898 by reducing calcium iodide with pure sodium metal:
CaI2  +  2 Na  →  2 NaI + Ca

Calcium iodide can be formed by treating calcium carbonate, calcium oxide, or calcium hydroxide with hydroiodic acid:
CaCO3  +  2 HI  →   CaI2  +  H2O + CO2

Calcium iodide slowly reacts with oxygen and carbon dioxide in the air, liberating iodine, which is responsible for the faint yellow color of impure samples.
 2 CaI2 + 2 CO2 + O2 → 2 CaCO3 + 2 I2

References

Calcium compounds
Iodides
Alkaline earth metal halides
Deliquescent substances